Qaleh Sardar (also Romanized as Qal‘eh Sardār; also known as Qal‘eh) is a village in Nazluchay Rural District, Nazlu District, Urmia County, West Azerbaijan Province, Iran. At the 2006 census, its population was 387, in 90 families.

References 

Populated places in Urmia County